Crossroads Mall may refer to:

In United States of America:

 Crossroads Center (St. Cloud, Minnesota), a shopping mall in St. Cloud, Minnesota
 Crossroads Mall (Waterloo, Iowa), a shopping mall in Waterloo, Iowa
 Crossroads Mall (Colorado), former shopping mall in Boulder, Colorado
 Crossroads Mall (Florida), a former shopping mall in the Tampa-St. Petersburg, Florida Bay Area
 The Crossroads (Portage, Michigan), a shopping mall in Portage (Kalamazoo), Michigan
 Crossroads Mall (Omaha), a shopping mall in Omaha, Nebraska
 Crossroads Mall (Oklahoma), a former shopping mall in Oklahoma City, Oklahoma
 Crossroads Mall (Virginia), a small shopping mall in Airport, Roanoke, Virginia

In India:
 Crossroads Mall (Mumbai), the first shopping mall in Mumbai, India